Lists of database management systems provide indexes and/or comparisons of different types of database management system.
They include:

 List of relational database management systems, for database management systems based on the relational model. 
 Comparison of object database management systems, showing what fundamental object database features are implemented natively
 Document-oriented database, for storing, retrieving and managing document-oriented information
 List of column-oriented DBMSes that store data tables by column rather than by row
 List of in-memory databases, which primarily rely on main memory for computer data storage

See :Category:Database management systems for a complete lists of articles about database management systems.